Fahnestock may refer to:

Clarence Fahnestock State Park, a park in Putnam and Dutchess counties, New York, US
Fahnestock clip, an early type of spring clamp electrical terminal for connections to bare wires
Fahnestock Glacier, a glacier in Antarctica
Harris C. Fahnestock (1835–1914), American investment banker